Pheosia tremula, the swallow prominent, is a moth from the family Notodontidae. The species was first described by Carl Alexander Clerck in 1759.

The moth can be found in the Palearctic realm, up to the Arctic Circle (northern and central Europe, Russia, Russian Far East, Ussuri, Caucasus). It has a forewing length of 22–28 mm. The moth survives winter as a pupa underground.

Description
Normally whitish, with a brown shaded black stripe along the inner margin of the forewings, and a brownish cloud, with black streaks in it. Towards the tips of these wings; the outer extremities of the veins are white, there is a white wedge-shaped streak between veins 1 and 2, and from the apex of this an indented white line runs to the base of the wing. Sometimes the whole discal area is suffused with brownish. The imago can be easily mistaken with Pheosia gnoma.

The host plant of the swallow prominent are the poplar, especially the aspen, the willow and the birch. For detailed list see Robinson, G. S., P. R. Ackery, I. J. Kitching, G. W. Beccaloni & L. M. Hernández, 2010.

References

Further reading
South R. (1907) The Moths of the British Isles, (First Series), Frederick Warne & Co. Ltd., London & NY: 359 pp. online

External links

Fauna Europaea
Lepiforum e.V.
De Vlinderstichting 

Notodontidae
Moths described in 1759
Moths of Europe
Moths of Asia
Taxa named by Carl Alexander Clerck